Hernandia cubensis is a species of plant in the Hernandiaceae family. It is endemic to Cuba.  It is threatened by habitat loss.

References

Flora of Cuba
Hernandiaceae
Critically endangered plants
Taxonomy articles created by Polbot